The 1980 East Coast Conference men's basketball tournament was held February 25 – March 1, 1980.  The champion gained and an automatic berth to the NCAA tournament.

Bracket and results

* denotes overtime game

References

1980
Tournament
1980 in sports in Pennsylvania
Basketball competitions in Philadelphia
College basketball tournaments in Pennsylvania
February 1980 sports events in the United States
March 1980 sports events in the United States